Klaipėda LNG terminal is an liquefied natural gas import terminal in the port of Klaipėda, Lithuania.  It cost US$128 million to construct.  The developer and owner of the project is KN.

The terminal started operating on 3rd of December 2014. After the completion of the Klaipėda LNG FSRU, Lithuania became the fifth country in the world to use FSRU technology for liquefied natural gas.

History 
On 22–27 January 2014 pilot test was conducted in order to assess the FSRU Independence's performance and seaworthiness. Later on the vessel sailed to the sea and the ship's sea trial lasted nearly a week. Earlier, in the beginning of January the ship's propulsion system was tested, later crew safety equipment and other range of testing conducted.  It was delivered in March 2014 and was reached the terminal on 27 October 2014.

In June 2014 supplying platform was finished to be built in Kiaulės Nugara. It is one of the four main elements of  length embankment (together with mounting and mooring field, steel bridges and high-pressure gas platform).

On 27 October 2014 the main vessel arrived to Klaipėda's Port. The welcoming ceremony of Independence arrival was broadcast live by national broadcaster LRT televizija, while the ship was greeted by Lithuanian President Dalia Grybauskaitė. Representatives from Latvia, Estonia, Norway, the United States, Finland, Sweden and European Council also participated at the opening.

On 3 December 2014 the terminal started operating.

On 27 October 2017, LNG Distribution Station at Klaipėda Port started operating. Station is dedicated to create a comprehensive LNG logistics chain in the Baltic region.

On 7 January 2019, the world's largest liquefied natural gas bunkering vessel Kairos, owned by KN and German company Nauticor, was launched at that time. The ship's main activity in Klaipeda port is to transport LNG from the LNG terminal to LNG distribution station. In September 2019, Klaipėdos Nafta sold its shares in Kairos, the company that owns the bunkering vessel Kairos.

Storage and regasification vessel 

FSRU Independence, an LNG carrier built by Hyundai Heavy Industries, is designed as a floating LNG storage and regasification unit for the terminal. It is leased from Höegh LNG for 10 years with an option of buyout. Lithuania also has access to the Inčukalns underground gas storage facility in Latvia.

Supply
Equinor is contracted to supply LNG for five years to cover the minimum operational need of the terminal.  In 2015, Equinor will supply  of natural gas.  The first test cargo was delivered on 28 October 2014 by LNG tanker Golar Seal. Gas was originating from the Snøhvit field (Melkøya LNG plant).  It was imported by Litgas, a subsidiary of Lietuvos Energija.

Awards 
At the 8th European Gas Conference 2015 in Vienna, Austria Klaipėda LNG FSRU won the Project of the Year award.

Supporting infrastructure 
Previously Klaipėda was only connected to one main pipeline of Klaipėda–Panevėžys pipeline within Lithuanian gas grid.

To ensure continuous supply of gas from Klaipėda LNG FSRU to Lithuanian gas market, additional main gas pipelines built, connecting to the terminal:
 Klaipėda–Jurbarkas pipeline, opened in 2013.
 Klaipėda–Kuršėnai pipeline, opened in 2015.

See also

References

Liquefied natural gas terminals
2014 establishments in Lithuania
Economy of Klaipėda
Energy infrastructure in Lithuania
Natural gas in Lithuania